Sabrang Union is a union, the smallest administrative body of Bangladesh, located in Teknaf Upazila, Cox's Bazar District, Bangladesh. The total population is 46,512. In September 2017, six Rohingya refugees died while trying to enter Bangladesh after their boat drowned.

NGO working
MSF (Doctors without Borders),SHED (Society for Health Extension & Development), Brac, Pulse Bangladesh, Nacom, Muslim Aid, Uddipon, Rtm, Tai, Msf, Save the children, IOM, Mukti cox's Bazar, ACF, DRC, Ipsa, Codec, aid comilla etc. Caritas Bangladesh, NRC.

References

Unions of Teknaf Upazila